The 2021–22 Nevada Wolf Pack men's basketball team represented the University of Nevada, Reno during the 2021–22 NCAA Division I men's basketball season. The Wolf Pack, led by third-year head coach Steve Alford, played their home games at the Lawlor Events Center in Reno, Nevada as members of the Mountain West Conference.

Previous season
In a season limited due to the ongoing COVID-19 pandemic, the Wolf Pack finished the 2020–21 season 16–10, 10–7 in Mountain West play to finish in fifth place. They defeated Boise State in the quarterfinals of the Mountain West tournament before losing in the semifinals to San Diego State.

Offseason

Departures

Incoming transfers

2021 recruiting class

Roster

Schedule and results

|-
!colspan=9 style=| Exhibition

|-
!colspan=9 style=| Non-conference regular season

|-
!colspan=9 style=| Mountain West regular season

|-
!colspan=9 style=| Mountain West tournament

Source

References

Nevada Wolf Pack men's basketball seasons
Nevada
Nevada Wolf Pack
Nevada Wolf Pack